Wolfgram is a surname. Notable people with the surname include:

See also

 Wolfgramm